"Either Way" is a song by American R&B singer K. Michelle featuring Chris Brown. The song was released on September 15, 2017 through Atlantic Records, taken from her fourth studio album, Kimberly: The People I Used to Know (2017).

Critical reception
The song gained positive reviews from critics. 
HotNewHipHop gave the track a positive review stating "Aiming this one at the airwaves, K Michelle delivers an unapologetic record that finds her spitting some braggadocios bars aimed at her haters, while reminding everyone that she gon’ be good “either way.”" Vibe praised the song stating "A series of trap beats and a talk-rap narrative engulf the song’s club-banging track, as she tells all her haters and foes how she’s increasing her bank accounts regardless of their disapproval and constant chatter."

Formats and track listings
Explicit digital download
 "Either Way" (feat. Chris Brown) – 4:14

Clean digital download
 "Either Way" (feat. Chris Brown) – 4:14

Chart performance
"Either Way" debuted at number 19 on US Billboard R&B Digital Song Sales chart for the week beginning October 7, 2017.

Charts

Release History

References

2017 songs
2017 singles
K. Michelle songs
Chris Brown songs
Songs written by Lil' Ronnie
Songs written by Chris Brown
Atlantic Records singles
Songs written by K. Michelle